Souleymen Nasr (born 24 February 1997) is a Tunisian Greco-Roman wrestler. He represented Tunisia at the 2019 African Games held in Rabat, Morocco and he won the silver medal in the 67 kg event. He is also a three-time medalist at the African Wrestling Championships.

Career 

In 2014, he represented Tunisia at the Summer Youth Olympics held in Nanjing, China without winning a medal.

He qualified at the 2021 African & Oceania Wrestling Olympic Qualification Tournament to represent Tunisia at the 2020 Summer Olympics in Tokyo, Japan. He competed in the 67 kg event.

Achievements

References

External links 
 

Living people
1997 births
Place of birth missing (living people)
Tunisian male sport wrestlers
Wrestlers at the 2014 Summer Youth Olympics
African Games silver medalists for Tunisia
African Games medalists in wrestling
Competitors at the 2019 African Games
African Wrestling Championships medalists
Wrestlers at the 2020 Summer Olympics
Olympic wrestlers of Tunisia
20th-century Tunisian people
21st-century Tunisian people